During the 1900–01 English football season, Brentford competed in the Southern League Second Division. An unbeaten league season led to Brentford topping the division, before failing to beat Swindon Town in a promotion-relegation test match. Promotion was finally assured when the club was elected into the Southern League First Division in July 1901.

Season summary 
Despite the final implications of jumping the hurdle from amateur to professional status during the previous season, Brentford went into the 1900–01 Southern League Second Division campaign in a healthy state. The club moved from Cross Roads (near South Ealing station) back to Brentford and would play their matches at Boston Park Cricket Club's ground York Road, a move which was beneficial for both clubs. Harry Underwood, a member of the Brentford committee, also managed to persuade a number of local tradesmen, to whom the club owed over £100 (equivalent to £ in ), to write off the debt. Now under the charge of William Lewis as a team manager of sorts, Brentford trimmed down the playing staff and signed two new professional players – left back Harry Gilmour and inside forward Joe Turner. Because of the reduction in size of the Southern League Second Division, Brentford also entered the London League to help generate revenue.

Brentford began the Southern League season in fine form, but suffered a number of defeats in the early London League matches and consequently five new players were signed – goalkeeper Dave Clear, full back Jack Graham, half back William Hainsworth, inside right Roddy McLeod and centre forward Peter Turnbull. McLeod and Turnbull proved to be master-stroke signings and along with existing forwards Ralph McElhaney, E. Andrews and Joe Turner, the quintet fired Brentford to an unbeaten Southern League season. The Bees' 1st-place finish in the Second Division led to a test match at the end of the season versus Swindon Town, who had finished bottom of the First Division. With Brentford needing to win to secure promotion and with the score at 0–0, the match at Elm Park went into extra time and was called off after 107 minutes due to bad light.

In the aftermath of the abandoned test match, the Brentford committee resolved to apply for the place in the First Division left vacant by Bristol City, who had been elected into the Football League. Brentford were passed over in favour of Northampton Town at the Southern League's AGM on 1 June, but Gravesend United's departure from the First Division due to financial problems in July led to Brentford's election into the First Division for the 1901–02 season.

A number of club records were set during the season:
 Most Southern League away wins in a season: 7
 Least Southern League home draws in a season: 1
 Least Southern League defeats in a season: 0
 Least Southern League home defeats in a season: 0
 Least Southern League away defeats in a season: 0
 Record Southern League win: 11–1 versus Wycombe Wanderers, 16 February 1901
Least goalscorers in all competitions in a Southern League season

League table

Results
Brentford's goal tally listed first.

Legend

Southern League Second Division

Southern League Test Match

FA Cup

 Source: 100 Years of Brentford

Playing squad 

 Source: 100 Years of Brentford

Statistics

Appearances

Goalscorers 

Players listed in italics left the club mid-season.
Source: 100 Years Of Brentford

Management

Summary

Notes

References 

Brentford F.C. seasons
Brentford